2022 in Russia is the 31st year of the Russian Federation.

Leadership 
 President of Russia: Vladimir Putin
 Prime Minister of Russia: Mikhail Mishustin
 Chairman of the Federation Council: Valentina Matvienko
 Chairman of the State Duma: Vyacheslav Volodin

Events 
28 January – 20th Russian Golden Eagle Awards ceremony
3 February – in retaliation to Germany's broadcasting regulator's decision to ban transmission of the Russian state-run RT Deutsch channel over a lack of a broadcasting license, the Russian foreign ministry said that it would shut down Deutsche Welle's Moscow bureau, strip all DW staff of their accreditation and terminate broadcasting of DW in Russia. It also stated that it would begin the procedure of designating DW as a "foreign agent".
15 February – The Russian State Duma votes to ask President Vladimir Putin to recognize the self-declared Donetsk and Luhansk People's Republics in Ukraine as independent nations. The bill was proposed by the Communist Party.
21 February – Putin announces that Russia has recognized the self-declared Donetsk and Luhansk People's Republics in Ukraine as independent nations. This came after the Duma asked for it a week ago.
24 February – Russia launches a large-scale invasion of Ukraine from Crimea and Belarus.
10 March - After Russia was suspended from the Council of Europe in the wake of its 2022 invasion of Ukraine, and subsequently announced its intention to withdraw from the organization, former President (2008-2012) and Prime Minister (2012-2020) Dmitry Medvedev endorsed restoring the death penalty in Russia.
27 March - Leonid Pasechnik leader of the LPR said that the Luhansk People's Republic may hold a referendum to join Russia in the near future.
30 March - A few days later South Ossetian President Anatoly Bibilov announced his intention to begin legal proceedings in the near future to integration with the Russian Federation.
26 April - Veshkayma kindergarten shooting
2 August - The Russian Supreme Court declare the Azov Regiment as a terrorist organization.
18 August -  Russia revives the Soviet-era Mother Heroine award for women with 10 children.
21 August - A car bomb kills Darya Dugina, daughter of Alexander Dugin, an ideological advisor of Putin, who was due to travel in the same car.
18–19 September – A small but significant tornado outbreak affects Ukraine and Russia, killing three people.
31 August – War-related emigration following the Russian invasion of Ukraine reached 500,000.
19 September - the public chambers of the Donetsk People's Republic and Luhansk People's Republic appealed to their heads of state with a request to "immediately" hold a referendum on joining Russia.
20 September - the People's Council of the Luhansk People's Republic scheduled a referendum on the republic's entry into Russia as a federal subject for 23–27 September. Soon after, the People's Council of the Donetsk People's Republic announced that the referendum on the entry of the DPR into the Russian Federation would be held on the same date.
21 September - President Vladimir Putin announced the 2022 Russian mobilization. 
26 September - Izhevsk school shooting
27 September - 2022 annexation referendums in Russian-occupied Ukraine
According to the results released by Russian occupation authorities in Ukraine, the Donetsk People's Republic, the Luhansk People's Republic, as well as occupied parts of Zaporizhzhia and Kherson Oblasts overwhelmingly vote in favor of annexation, with 99.23%, 98.42%, 93.11% and 87.05% of support, respectively. Turnout exceeded 75% in each region and exceeded 97% in Donetsk Oblast. However, the voting has been widely dismissed as a sham referendum.
30 September - President Vladimir Putin signed decrees recognizing the Kherson and Zaporozhye regions as independent territories.
 Putin announced in a speech  that Russia had annexed the four regions occupied during the conflict.
17 October - 2022 Yeysk military aircraft crash
23 October - 2022 Irkutsk military aircraft crash
27 October - The State Duma unanimously gives preliminary approval to a bill strengthening a law against "propaganda of non-traditional sexual relations". The bill will expand the ban on "propaganda" to all ages, and will outlaw media and online resources, including films, books, and theater productions.
5 November - Kostroma café fire
24 November - The State Duma passes a bill strengthening a law against "propaganda of non-traditional sexual relations". The bill will expand the ban on "propaganda" to all ages, and will outlaw media and online resources, including films, books, and theater productions. 
5 December - President Vladimir Putin signs into law the "propaganda of non-traditional sexual relations"
8 December - Viktor Bout–Brittney Griner prisoner exchange
23 December - 2022 Kemerovo nursing home fire

Deaths

January

3 January – Olga Gavrilova, 64, Russian javelin thrower.
5 January – Filza Khamidullin, 86, Russian economist and politician, senator (2003–2005).
6 January – Vladimir Gudev, 81, Russian diplomat, Soviet ambassador to Iran (1987–1993), Egypt (1995–2000) and Georgia (2000–2002).
7 January – 
 Anatoly Kvashnin, 75, Russian military officer, chief of the general staff (1997–2004), COVID-19.
 Alexander Timofeevskiy, 88, Russian writer, songwriter and screenwriter (The Stone Flower). 
8 January – 
 Aleksandr Lebedev-Frontov, 61, Russian painter, collagist, and musician.
 Viktor Mazin, 67, Russian weightlifter, Olympic champion (1980).
 Nina Rocheva, 73, Russian cross-country skier, Olympic silver medallist (1980).

February

8 February – Valentina Polukhina, literary scholar (b. 1936).

March

1 March – Alevtina Kolchina, 91, Russian cross-country skier, Olympic champion (1964).
4 March – Valentin Knysh, 84, Russian politician, deputy (1995–2003).
7 March – Vasily Astafyev, 102, Russian Soviet army colonel.

April

6 April – Vladimir Zhirinovsky, leader of the nationalist far-right party Liberal Democratic Party of Russia (b. 1946).

May

2 May – Yuri Vasenin, 73, Russian football player (Zaria Voroshilovgrad, Soviet Union national team) and manager (Baltika Kaliningrad).
4 May – Yuliya Voyevodina, 50, Russian Olympic racewalker (2004).
7 May – Yuri Averbakh, 100, Russian chess grandmaster and author.

June

1 June – Aleksandr Berketov, 46, Russian footballer (Rotor Volgograd, CSKA Moscow).
2 June – 
 Andrey Gaponov-Grekhov, 95, Russian physicist.
 Anatoly Pokrovsky, 91, Russian vascular surgeon.

July

1 July – 
 Yuri Khaliullin, 78, Russian naval officer.
 Stanislav Leonovich, 63, Russian Olympic figure skater (1980).
2 July – 
 Dmitry Kolker, 54, Russian physicist, pancreatic cancer.
 Leonid Shvartsman, 101, Russian animator (Cheburashka, 38 Parrots, The Scarlet Flower).

August

1 August – Mikhail Golovatov, 72, Russian intelligence officer (KGB).
2 August – Nikolay Yefimov, 89, Russian journalist.
30 August – Mikhail Gorbachev, the 8th and final leader and 10th and last President of the Soviet Union, Nobel Peace Prize recipient (b. 1931).

September

1 September – Ravil Maganov, 67, Russian petroleum executive (Lukoil), fall.
4 September – Boris Lagutin, 84, Russian boxer, Olympic champion (1964, 1968).

See also

 Outline of the Russo-Ukrainian War

References

 
Russia
Russia
Russia
2020s in Russia
Years of the 21st century in Russia